Killer's Carnival is a 1966 crime film directed by Alberto Cardone and starring Stewart Granger.

Plot
A murderer takes refuge in a doctor's home, and the doctor tells him three stories in an attempt to convince him that crime doesn't pay.

Cast
 Stewart Granger as David Porter (Vienna segment)
 Lex Barker as Glenn Cassidy (San Francisco segment)
 Pierre Brice as Agent Brice (Rome segment)
 Karin Dor as Denise (San Francisco segment)
 Pascale Petit as Lotty (Vienna segment)
 Margaret Lee as Agent Linda (Rome segment)
 Walter Giller as Karl (Vienna segment)
 Johanna Matz as Monique Carrar (Vienna segment)
 Klaus Kinski as Gomez (San Francisco segment)
 Agnès Spaak as Nelly Small (San Francisco segment)
 Peter Vogel as Wendt, Suspected girls' killer
 Richard Münch as Professor Alden (Frame story)
 Carmen Cervera as Joana (San Francisco segment) (as Tita Barker)
 Allen Pinson as Ray Runner (San Francisco segment) (as Alan Pinson)
 Herbert Fux as Ganove (Vienna segment)
 Roberto Miali as Pessana (San Francisco segment) (as Jerry Wilson)
 Carla Calò as Female boss (Rome segment) (as Carrol Brown)
 Fortunato Arena as Taxi driver (Rome segment)
 Pietro Ceccarelli as Gangster #3 (Rome segment)
 Luciano Pigozzi as Ivan (Rome segment)

References

External links

Killer's Carnival at Variety Distribution

1966 films
1960s crime thriller films
1960s spy thriller films
1960s English-language films
English-language Austrian films
English-language French films
English-language Italian films
1960s French-language films
1960s Italian-language films
1960s German-language films
Films directed by Alberto Cardone
Films directed by Robert Lynn
Films directed by Sheldon Reynolds
Austrian detective films
French detective films
Italian detective films
French anthology films
Films set in Rio de Janeiro (city)
Films set in Rome
Films set in San Francisco
Films set in Vienna
Films with screenplays by Ernesto Gastaldi
1960s Italian films
1960s French films
Italian anthology films